Boraras is a small genus of Asian cyprinid fishes.

Species 
 Boraras brigittae (D. Vogt, 1978) (Chili rasbora, Mosquito rasbora)
 Boraras maculatus (Duncker, 1904) (Dwarf rasbora)
 Boraras merah (Kottelat, 1991) (Phoenix rasbora)
 Boraras micros Kottelat & Vidthayanon, 1993
 Boraras naevus Conway & Kottelat, 2011 (Strawberry rasbora)
 Boraras urophthalmoides (Kottelat, 1991) (Least rasbora, Exclamation point rasbora)

References 

 
 ;  2011: Boraras naevus, a new species of miniature and sexually dichromatic freshwater fish from peninsular Thailand (Ostariophysi: Cyprinidae). Zootaxa, 3002: 45–51. Preview PDF

External links

 
Fish of Asia
Taxa named by Maurice Kottelat
Freshwater fish genera
Taxa named by Chavalit Vidthayanon